Romar is a surname. Notable people with the surname include:

Andreas Romar (born 1989), Finnish alpine skier
John B. Romar, 19th century American city mayor 
Lorenzo Romar (born 1958), American basketball coach and former player